Ameson is a genus of microsporidia belonging to the family Pereziidae.

References

Microsporidia genera